The Charter of Labour of 1927 was one of the main pieces of legislation Benito Mussolini, the Italian Fascist dictator from 1922–43, introduced in his attempts to modernise the Italian economy. The Charter was promulgated by the Grand Council of Fascism and publicized in the Lavoro d'Italia newspaper on 23 April 1927. It was mainly designed by Giuseppe Bottai, Under-Secretary of State of Corporations.

Content
The Charter declared private enterprise to be the most efficient, thus helping Mussolini to confirm the support of the rich industrialists who were the initial backers of Fascism. It insisted that state intervention was legitimate only where private enterprise was deficient.

Article 1:
"The Italian Nation is an organism having ends, life, and means of action superior to those of individuals, singly or in groups, of which it is composed. It is a moral, political, and economic unity, realized wholly in the Fascist State."

Article 2:
"Work, in all its intellectual, technical, and manual forms, is a social obligation. To this end, and only to this end, it is safeguarded by the State. The totality of production is unitary from the national point of view; its objectives are unitary and comprise the well-being of the producers and the development of national strength."

Article 3: 
"There is freedom of professional or union organization. But only the union legally recognized by, and subject to, the control of the State has the right to legally represent the entire category of employers or employees by which it is constituted [...]; or to stipulate collective labor contracts binding on all those belonging to the category; or to impose on them dues, or to exercise on their behalf delegate functions of public interest."

Article 4: 
"In the collective labor contract is found the concrete expression of the solidarity of the various makers of the product, by means of the conciliation of the opposing interests of the employers and the workers, and their subordination to the superior interests of production."

Article 6:
"Legally recognized professional associations insure the legal equality between employers and workers, maintain the discipline of production and work, and promotes its perfection. Corporations constitute the unitary organizations of production and integrally represent its interests [...]. Corporations are recognized legally as organs of the State [...]."

Article 7: 
"The corporative State considers private initiative, in the field of production, as the most efficient and useful instrument of the Nation." 

Article 9 stated that:
"State intervention in economic production may take place only where private initiative is lacking or is insufficient, or when are at stakes the political interest of the State. This intervention may take the form of control, encouragement or direct management."

Article 13: 
"The duty of employment is under control of the corporate organs. Employers have the obligation to hire workers who are official members of the appropriate trades, and have the power to choose from the rolls of membership, giving precedence to the members of the party and the Fascist unions according to their seniority of membership."

It created a Labour Court supposed to regulate labour controversies (article 5), as well as corporations aimed at superating class conflict. This objective was more or less concretized in the 1934 law on corporations, although workers did not have the possibility of electing their representatives, who were nominated by the state. Beside these state-nominated workers' representatives, the corporations included representatives of the firms' directors.

Collective contracts (established by article 4) were negotiated following the issuing of the Charter of Labour, but with the effect of a decrease in wages. Collective contracts were able to ensure long term employment and large scale welfare including paid vacations and numerous other fringe benefits workers hadn't previously enjoyed. Not until during the Great Depression did the state subsidize welfare; until then employers were made to pay for all benefits.

See also
Labour law
International Labour Organization
Economics of Italian Fascism
Fascist socialization

Notes

Italian Fascism
History of labour law
1927 in Italy
1927 in law
Legal history of Italy
Italian labour law
1927 documents